Calallen is a former town that existed until the 1960s. Today, Calallen is a suburb of Corpus Christi. It is located in Nueces County, in the Coastal Bend region of Texas. It is bound to the north by the Nueces River, which also marks the boundary between Nueces County and San Patricio County.

History

The community was named for Calvin Joseph “Cal” Allen (1859-1922), a noted rancher who was born and raised about three miles up the Nueces River from the future townsite.  He established a 5,000-acre spread where he herded wild cattle and cultivated his herds.  He was among the first to bring fine-blooded stock into South Texas for the improvement of beef brands.  The New Encyclopedia of Texas (1929) described Allen as "one of the most beloved characters of the old Southwest."  Upon his death, the Corpus Christi Caller called him "one of the most highly honored and prominent ranchmen of the Southwest".  

In 1900 the St. Louis, Brownsville and Mexico Railway, which was building southward to the Rio Grande Valley, decided to bypass the pioneer community of Nuecestown and run its tracks a few miles away.  Allen donated right-of-way to the railroad; in return, the railroad built a water stop and depot on Allen’s property.  Allen then divided some of his ranch land along the nearby Nueces River into lots and put it on the market.  Soon a community formed along the railroad.

The railroad initially named the stop Calvin.  However, when it was discovered that another town in Texas had secured that name, residents settled on Calallen, combining Allen’s nickname and surname.  The community received a post office in 1908 with Ira D. Magee as the first postmaster. Meanwhile, Nuecestown slowly dissipated. 

The main part of Calallen grew around the west side of the railroad tracks, and included a bank, lumber yard, pharmacy, funeral home, meat market and numerous general mercantile stores.  Two passenger trains stopped at Calallen each day in addition to regular freight traffic.  In 1914 the town had 150 residents and nine businesses. Its population fell to twenty-five by 1925 but reached 100 in 1939.

Calallen had Baptist, Catholic and Methodist churches and a large two-story hotel on its main street.  Its top employer was the Corpus Christi Water Plant, one of the first large non-agricultural employers in the area.  

Others businesses continued to move into the town and its peripheral area.  Among these were the C. E. Coleman vegetable packing sheds, which sat along the railroad tracks, the Calallen Gin, and the Ault Apiary, where bees were raised.  Familiar names in the community included Allen, Atkinson, Ault, Bickham, Harney, Hearn, Hunter, Magee, McKinzie and Noakes. 

After World War II Calallen's role in local industry diminished.  The post office was discontinued sometime after 1960.  Calallen was never legally incorporated, and by 1966 it was annexed by the City of Corpus Christi.  

The original community name survives in the Calallen Independent School District, Calallen Dam and numerous businesses.

Transportation

Corpus Christi is home to a major intersection point between Interstate 37 and U.S. Highway 77. U.S. Highway 77 is one of the two U.S. highways, along with U.S. Highway 281 in Three Rivers, that provides direct access to the Rio Grande Valley from Interstate 37. Many northbound U.S. Highway 77 vehicles seeking the main city body would've turned eastward at Texas State Highway 44 in Robstown, as this is a shorter and faster route compared to turning eastward at Interstate 37. Northbound U.S. Highway 77 vehicles seeking Padre Island and Corpus Christi's southeast suburbs would also rather take FM 665 eastward at Driscoll.

After the major intersection, Interstate 37 and U.S. Highway 77 travel about 2 miles north before leaving the city limits and entering San Patricio County. Almost immediately after crossing the Nueces River into the Odem zip code, the two highways split, with Interstate 37 heading northwest towards Mathis and eventually to San Antonio, while U.S. Highway 77 leads northeast towards Sinton and eventually to Victoria.

Corpus Christi is also home to the eastern terminus of FM 624, which turns northwest towards Orange Grove ( and eventually  to Cotulla .

Geology

While the surrounding communities in the area are generally flat in terrain, many parts of Corpus Christi is rolling due to its position on the valley of the Nueces River. Corpus Christi experiences sea breeze often due to its proximity to the coast.

Education
Calallen Independent School District
Calallen High School (Grades 9–12)
Calallen Middle School (Grades 6–8)
Magee Intermediate School (under construction)
West Intermediate School (Grades 4th and 5th)
East Primary School (Grades Kindergarten-3)
Wood River Primary School (Grades Kindergarten-3)

Calallen is known for having one of the most successful high school football programs in the South Texas region, making numerous deep playoff runs and making the state championship game in 2005 and 2016. The football program is led by head coach Phil Danaher, who has the most wins of any high school coach in Texas with 427 wins (as of 2016).

See also
Corpus Christi

References

External links
Handbook of Texas Online

Geography of Corpus Christi, Texas